The 2022 Orléans Masters was a badminton tournament that took place in the Palais des Sports at Orléans, France, from 29 March to 3 April 2022. The tournament had a total prize pool of $90,000.

Tournament
The 2022 Orléans Masters was the seventh tournament and the second Super 100 tournament of the 2022 BWF World Tour. It was part of the Orléans Masters championships which had been held since 2012. It was organized by the Cercle Laïque des Tourelles Orléans (CLTO) Badminton with sanction from the Badminton World Federation.

Venue
This tournament took place at the Palais des Sports in Orléans, Centre-Val de Loire, France.

Point distribution
Below is the point distribution table for each phase of the tournament based on the BWF points system for the BWF Tour Super 100 event.

Prize pool
The total prize money was US$90,000 with the distribution of the prize money in accordance with BWF regulations.

Men's singles

Seeds 

 B. Sai Praneeth (third round)
 Hans-Kristian Vittinghus (third round)
 Mark Caljouw (second round)
 Toma Junior Popov (champion)
 Brice Leverdez (withdrew)
 Thomas Rouxel (second round)
 Ygor Coelho (third round)
 Toby Penty (second round)

Finals

Top half

Section 1

Section 2

Bottom half

Section 3

Section 4

Women's singles

Seeds 

 Michelle Li (withdrew)
 Gregoria Mariska Tunjung (withdrew)
 Line Kjærsfeldt (semi-finals)
 Iris Wang (final)
 Lianne Tan (withdrew)
 Julie Dawall Jakobsen (first round)
 Qi Xuefei (first round)
 Ruselli Hartawan (second round)

Finals

Top half

Section 1

Section 2

Bottom half

Section 3

Section 4

Men's doubles

Seeds 

 Mark Lamsfuß / Marvin Seidel (withdrew)
 Christo Popov / Toma Junior Popov (first round)
 Adam Hall / Alexander Dunn (first round)
 Fabien Delrue / William Villeger (second round)
 Callum Hemming / Steven Stallwood (first round)
 Krishna Prasad Garaga / Vishnuvardhan Goud Panjala (withdrew)
 Ruben Jille / Ties van der Lecq (champions)
 Christopher Grimley / Matthew Grimley (quarter-finals)

Finals

Top half

Section 1

Section 2

Bottom half

Section 3

Section 4

Women's doubles

Seeds 

 Gabriela Stoeva / Stefani Stoeva (champions)
 Amalie Magelund / Freja Ravn (withdrew)
 Linda Efler / Isabel Lohau (withdrew)
 Julie MacPherson / Ciara Torrance (quarter-final)
 Apriyani Rahayu / Siti Fadia Silva Ramadhanti (withdrew)
 Debora Jille / Cheryl Seinen (withdrew)
 Anna Cheong / Teoh Mei Xing (second round)
 Chloe Birch / Jessica Pugh (semi-final)

Finals

Top half

Section 1

Section 2

Bottom half

Section 3

Section 4

Mixed doubles

Seeds 

 Thom Gicquel / Delphine Delrue (withdrew)
 Mark Lamsfuß / Isabel Lohau (withdrew)
 Robin Tabeling / Selena Piek (withdrew)
 Mikkel Mikkelsen / Rikke Søby Hansen (first round)
 Chan Peng Soon / Toh Ee Wei (first round)
 Jones Ralfy Jansen / Linda Efler (withdrew)
 Ishaan Bhatnagar / Tanisha Crasto (quarter-final)
 Terry Hee / Tan Wei Han (champions)

Finals

Top half

Section 1

Section 2

Bottom half

Section 3

Section 4

References

External links
 Tournament link
 Official website

Orléans Masters
Orléans Masters
Orléans Masters
Orléans Masters
Orléans Masters